The First Battle of Passchendaele took place on 12 October 1917 during the First World War, in the Ypres Salient in Belgium on the Western Front. The attack was part of the Third Battle of Ypres and was fought west of Passchendaele village. The British had planned to capture the ridges south and east of the city of Ypres as part of a strategy decided by the Allies at conferences in November 1916 and May 1917. Passchendaele lay on the last ridge east of Ypres,  from the railway junction at Roulers, which was an important part of the supply system of the German 4th Army.

After a dry spell in September, rains began on 3 October and by the Battle of Poelcappelle on 9 October much of the British field artillery opposite Passchendaele was out of action due to rain, mud and German artillery-fire. The remaining guns were either left in old positions and fired at the limit of their range or were operated from any flat ground near wooden roadways or from platforms, many of which were unstable, where it was found impossible to move them forward. General Herbert Plumer and Field Marshal Douglas Haig were left under the impression that a big advance had been made towards Passchendaele ridge but most of the ground had been lost to German counter-attacks in the afternoon.

The British attack on 12 October began  from the village instead of the  originally thought by the British commanders. Air reconnaissance revealed the true position too late to make substantial changes to the plan. The main attack of the Second Army was by the two Anzac Corps, supported by the Fifth Army to the north. On Passchendaele Ridge, opposite the I Anzac and II Anzac Corps, the attack was repulsed or captured ground was recovered by German counter-attacks. The attack on the right flank of the Fifth Army was a costly failure but on the left, the fringe of Houthoulst Forest was gained. British attacks were postponed until the weather improved and communications behind the front were restored.

The battle was a German defensive success but was mutually costly and two German divisions were diverted to Flanders to replace "extraordinarily high" losses. In the worst weather conditions of the campaign, in the five weeks after the Battle of Broodseinde, the number of troops engaged by the British amounted to no more than those involved in the Battle of Pilckem Ridge on 31 July. British casualties in October 1917 were the third highest of the war, after July 1916 and April 1917.

Background

Tactical developments

In July 1917, Field Marshal Douglas Haig began the Third Battle of Ypres campaign to advance from the Ypres Salient. At the Battle of Messines, the far (east) side of the Messines Ridge had been captured down to the Oosttaverne Line and a substantial success gained in the subsequent Battle of Pilckem Ridge. At the Battle of Langemarck there was only an advance of  around Langemarck village by XIV Corps and the French First Army on the northern flank. The failure of the Fifth Army to advance on the Gheluvelt Plateau in August, led Haig to send artillery reinforcements to the south-east, along the higher ground of the Gheluvelt plateau, Broodseinde Ridge and the southern half of Passchendaele Ridge. The Gheluvelt Plateau was taken over by the Second Army ( General Herbert Plumer), which continued the evolution of bite-and-hold tactics that had been used in July and August.

The Second Army planned to attack with a succession of bodies of infantry on narrower fronts, to the first objective about  forward; the second objective was  beyond and the final objective was  further on. Pauses on the objectives would become longer and attacks would be protected by a bigger, deeper, multi-layered creeping barrage. Standing barrages beyond the objectives were to be fired during pauses to obstruct German counter-attacks, to confront them with defensive areas based on the British objectives. The British infantry would be in communication with its artillery and have much more local support from the Royal Flying Corps (RFC). At the Battle of the Menin Road Ridge (20 September), Battle of Polygon Wood (26 September) and Battle of Broodseinde (4 October), these methods produced a  advance in two weeks, inflicted many German casualties. The Germans changed tactics several times against the refined British methods but all failed.

In the lower ground west of the Passchendaele Ridge, three months of shelling had blocked the watercourses that normally provided drainage. On the night of 4 October, it began to rain intermittently for the next three days. Much of the battlefield again became a quagmire, making movement extremely difficult. Had the German defence collapsed during the Battle of Poelcappelle on 9 October, the reserve brigades of II Anzac Corps were to have passed through later in the day, to advance to far side of Passchendaele village and the Goudberg spur to the north. On 7 October, the afternoon attack had been cancelled by Haig because of the rain and the final details of the plan for the renewed attack of 12 October, were decided on the evening of 9 October. Plumer had received misleading information about the progress of the attack that day and believed that "a sufficiently good jumping-off line" had been achieved, passing the erroneous information back to Haig. The decision was made to continue the offensive to gain higher ground for the winter, to assist the French with their attack due on 23 October (the Battle of La Malmaison) and to hold German troops in Flanders for the Battle of Cambrai due in November.

Prelude

British preparations

Encouraged by the unusually high German losses during the Battle of Broodseinde and reports of lowered German morale, Haig sought quickly to renew the Allied offensive and secure Passchendaele Ridge. The Battle of Poelcappelle began on 9 October and was costly to both sides; most of the ground captured opposite Passchendaele was lost later in the day to German counter-attacks. News of this German defensive success was slow in reaching the higher British commanders, because the usual collapse of communications during an attack was exacerbated by the rain and mud.  Late on 9 October, Plumer erroneously informed Haig that II Anzac Corps had reached the first objective, which made a good jumping-off position for the attack due on 12 October. Many British guns had sunk in the mud, bogged down while being moved forward or run short of ammunition. German artillery fire had become much heavier as British heavy artillery counter-battery fire almost ceased from 9 to 12 October, as attempts were made to move the guns forward, although the defenders were still caused considerable difficulty by British bombardments.

The 66th (2nd East Lancashire) Division, on the right flank, was found to be back near its start line of 9 October. The New Zealand Division made hurried preparations to restore communications and reconnoitre the ground, because information from the 49th (West Riding) Division headquarters was insufficient; some wounded were still stranded in no-man's-land when the attack began on 12 October. Many field guns needed for the attack remained bogged in the mud and other field guns were placed on improvised platforms, when their new sites had proved impossible to reach, from which they fired slowly and inaccurately or sank into the mud. A German bombardment took place on the morning of 11 October and later in the day the British shelled the German defences on Wallemolen spur, to little effect. Some progress was made in the building of plank roads since the attack on 9 October and a few more guns had reached their new positions by 12 October. The Commander, Royal Artillery (CRA) of the New Zealand Division reported that adequate artillery support for his division could not be guaranteed.

The New Zealand Division commander, Major-General Andrew Russell, later wrote that accurate information had arrived  too late to ask for a postponement or radically to alter the barrage plan and unit orders. Duckboard tracks had been extended to the line held on 9 October, which allowed infantry to move up on the night of 11 October in time for the attack, despite rain and a German gas bombardment on Gravenstafel spur. High winds and heavy rain began about zero hour and lasted all day.

British plan

The II Anzac Corps and the Second Army headquarters were misinformed as to the extent of the advance achieved on 9 October. The I Anzac Corps with the 4th and 5th Australian divisions, in place of the exhausted 1st and 2nd Australian divisions, was to provide a flank guard to the south. The I Anzac Corps was to advance across the Keiberg Spur and dig in on the flank of the main assault, at the first and second objective lines only,  and  forward.

The 3rd Australian Division would attack Passchendaele ridge and the village and the New Zealand Division was to capture the Bellevue Spur. The first objective (Red Line) was practically the same as the second objective of the attack on 9 October,  forward, beyond the Bellevue pillboxes. The second objective (Blue Line) was  beyond, at the junction of the Wallemolen Spur and was the jumping-off line for the attack on the village of Passchendaele. The final objective (Green Line) lay  beyond the village.

Although short of fresh troops, the Fifth Army was to establish the northern flank of the main attack. In the XVIII Corps area, the 26th Brigade of the 9th Division was to advance  to the ridge north of the Goudberg re-entrant and the 55th Brigade of the 18th (Eastern) Division was to attack for a similar distance north of the Lekkerboterbeek creek. In the XIV Corps area, the 12th Brigade of the 4th Division, the 51st Brigade of the 17th Division and the 3rd Guards Brigade of the Guards Division, were to advance beyond Poelcappelle and close up to Houthoulst Forest, on the boundary with the French First Army.

In the New Zealand Division sector, the two attacking brigades each had a machine-gun company and three other machine-gun companies were to fire a machine-gun barrage. The division had the nominal support of a hundred and forty-four 18-pounder field guns and forty-eight 4.5-inch howitzers The artillery was expected to move forward after the final objective was gained, to bombard German-held ground from positions  beyond Passchendaele village. On the southern flank, the I Anzac Corps was to capture ground south of the Ypres–Roulers railway, the X Corps and IX Corps attacking on the right.

German preparations

In between the German positions lay the Belgian villages of Zonnebeke and Passchendaele. After their defensive success on 9 October, the Germans brought fresh divisions into the line but the tempo of British operations caused considerable anxiety among German commanders. The 18th Division took over in the Poelcappelle area; on a } front, the division had 17 heavy machine-guns and large numbers of MG 08/15 machine-guns distributed among its infantry companies.

Ludendorff's defensive changes had been implemented in some parts of the front, despite a certain reluctance by some of the local commanders. Outposts beyond the German advanced defensive zone were to hold the front line in enough strength to stop the British from sapping forward. The garrisons were to withdraw to the main line at the rear of the  when attacked, signalling to the artillery with rockets and Very lights for barrage fire. The German artillery would place the barrage in front of the main line of resistance, before the British infantry reached it and if possible, the troops in the front position were to attempt to defeat the attack without calling on the supporting  Division, to limit casualties.

In his diary, Rupprecht wrote that he was doubtful about the changes of tactics required by Ludendorff, especially his instructions for more counter-battery fire, since in previous battles the German artillery had engaged British infantry. An anticipated French attack on the Chemin des Dames, meant that fewer reinforcements could be expected by the 4th Army, making a fighting withdrawal the only possible response to the British attacks. Rupprecht wrote that the fighting power of German troops in Flanders was declining and that all attempts to counter the British artillery had failed, requiring a greater retreat, far enough back to force the British into a laborious artillery redeployment. After being postponed from 2 October, due to delays in the transport of ammunition,  (Operation Moonlight) took place at midnight on  A strip of ground from Messines to Dixmude was bombarded with gas, which high winds dispersed with little effect on Allied troops.

Battle

Second Army

The two Anzac Corps of the Second Army conducted the main attack. The 12th Brigade of the 4th Australian Division, advanced on time at  but saw no infantry from the 3rd Australian Division beyond the railway. The brigade captured the Keiberg cutting and consolidated, along with the rest of the first objective, although with many casualties. The 9th Brigade of the 3rd Australian Division, managed to reach the first objective and the battalion due to advance to the second objective went straight on. As soon as those troops began to descend from a slight rise, they were engaged by German field and heavy artillery. The brigade kept going to the second objective, although part of the advance remained bogged down short of the first objective. The 10th Brigade (3rd Australian Division) suffered many casualties from machine-guns in pillboxes but found some cover at a fold near the first objective, despite increasing machine-gun fire from the Bellevue pillboxes.

The New Zealand advance was obstructed by uncut barbed wire on the Wallemolen spur; the creeping barrage was very thin, as some guns were bogged and others had been knocked out by German artillery. The creeping barrage diminished as it moved forward and howitzer shells, plunging into wet ground around the Bellevue pillboxes exploded harmlessly. The German artillery fired all the way to the rear of the New Zealand divisional area and machine-gun barrages from the German pillboxes raked the advance. The division captured the cemetery at Wallemolen and reached Wolf Copse, the right of the advance stopping on the rise astride the Ravebeek creek. The infantry tried to cut their way through the wire of the German  on the Wallemolen spur and small numbers of troops got through both belts but were killed after being stopped by more wire around the German pillboxes. Further south, the New Zealand Division captured two pillboxes, with help from 3rd Australian Division troops in the area. An advance began up the northern slope of the Ravebeek creek but broke down quickly around Laamkeek. At  the surviving New Zealand infantry were ordered to dig-in.

The advance of the Australians towards the second objective began at  but the 10th Brigade had suffered too many casualties to advance and dug-in to wait for reinforcements. A party from the 10th Brigade kept going and arrived at the pillbox near Crest Farm, whose occupants promptly surrendered. The party then advanced into Passchendaele village before German troops rallied and re-occupied the pillbox.

The attack was eventually cancelled, as the 9th (Scottish) Division to the north and the 3rd Australian Division to the south were forced back by the fire of the Bellevue machine-guns. The artillery bombardment went ahead, dropping on some New Zealand positions but also dispersing two German parties massing for a counter-attack. By  the 10th Brigade had filtered back to its start-line, due to fire from the Bellevue Spur. The 9th Brigade was exposed by this retirement and fell back from the second objective in the face of artillery, machine-gun and sniper fire, with many casualties. When the Anzac advance broke into the front between Passchendaele and the Keiberg Spur, I Battalion, Reserve Infantry Regiment 55 of the 220th Division was attached to the 195th Division and II Battalion, Reserve Infantry Regiment 55 to the 233rd Division. With the divisions in the front line, the German reinforcements reoccupied the areas vacated by the Australians and New Zealanders, capturing  and many wounded Australians. In the evening, most of the New Zealand Division withdrew to a line on the lower slopes of the Wallemolen spur.

Fifth Army

Protection of the northern flank of the main attack by the Second Army was provided by the Fifth Army, with a brigade each of the 9th (Scottish) and 18th (Eastern) divisions of XVIII Corps. The brigades attacked from north of Goudberg to north of the Lekkerboterbeek stream, adjacent to the northern boundary of the Second Army. The 26th Brigade of the 9th (Scottish) Division was to advance  on a  front, with its left flank on the Lekkerboterbeek, into an area dotted with fortified farm buildings. The 55th Brigade of the 18th (Eastern) Division attacked north of the Lekkerboterbeek, over ground soaked after rain all day on 11 October. A low-flying German aircraft had reconnoitred the area near the 55th Brigade so the position of the jumping-off line was altered, to avoid a possible German counter-barrage as the brigade formed up for the advance.

XVIII Corps

The 9th (Scottish) Division was hampered by the effect of rain and mud on supply routes, which stranded guns and caused shortages of ammunition, particularly in smoke shells. At midnight on 11 October, torrential rain fell and a German gas and high explosive bombardment fell on the divisional forming-up areas. The advancing troops lost direction and communication broke down, as carrier pigeons were hindered by the high wind and messenger dog handlers became casualties. The infantry continued their advance and on the right of the captured Adler Farm and reached the green line at Source Trench.

In the centre, the attackers had to dig in after a  advance. Small parties reached Source Trench and some may have advanced as far as Vat Cottages. On the left of the brigade the ground was even worse, the infantry were unable to keep up with the barrage and lost direction but managed to capture a pillbox and move forward. Some of the troops on the left flank inadvertently crossed the Lekkerboterbeek, advanced  and then formed a flank with troops from the 18th (Eastern) Division. Except on the right flank, the attack was stopped by the Germans only  from the start line, despite the 27th Brigade being sent to reinforce the attack, in which some of the British infantry drowned in shell-holes. The new front line ran from the junction with the New Zealand Division at the cemetery near Wallemolen, to Oxford Houses then back to the old front line.

The divisional field artillery suffered the same fate as those of the divisions to the south, many guns sinking into the soft ground. A German counter-barrage began within a minute of the advance and as British troops took cover, German machine-gunners fired at the crater lips of shell-holes, through which bullets penetrated and hit the soldiers sheltering inside. The effect of the German barrage was worst on the right flank and added to German machine-gun fire from the Brewery and Helles House strong points; the situation at Requette Farm was not known as all runners sent from the area were killed. Mud clogged weapons of all types and at  a British trench-mortar battery and some supporting machine-guns had to cease fire, because of wet and dirty ammunition. At noon, German counter-attacks towards the west end of Poelcappelle began and lasted all afternoon, the Germans trying to exploit a gap between the British 4th and 18th divisions. Defensive positions in shell-holes were held by the survivors of the British attack.

XIV Corps

The northern flank of the Fifth Army, on the boundary with the French First Army, was held by XIV Corps, which also attacked with a brigade of each division to close up to Houthoulst Forest. After dark on 11 October, tape was laid beyond the front line in the corps area, for the troops to form up on, beyond a possible German counter-barrage. To avoid detection, scouts patrolled further forward, to ambush German patrols. The 3rd Guards Brigade of the Guards Division moved up on the night of 11 October, through heavy rain and a German gas barrage (Operation Mondnacht), which caused many casualties in this part of the front.

The 12th Brigade headquarters (4th Division) next to the XVIII Corps area, was to attack with a composite force of two battalions of the 10th Brigade and two from the 12th Brigade. Two battalions were to lead, with a battalion each in support and reserve, following on to a first objective about  forward, then pivoting on the right to the final objective another  forward at Water House. The ground had been soaked again by overnight rain and the advance by the right-hand battalion was stopped at Requette Farm by determined German resistance and massed machine-gun fire, during which contact with the neighbouring battalion of the 18th (Eastern) Division was lost. The left-hand battalion advance faced less opposition and by  had crossed the Poelcappelle–le Cinq Chemins road, captured Memling and Senegal farms and then made contact with the 17th (Northern) Division. After the capture of Requette Farm by the right-hand battalion, more German machine-gun fire was received from the Brewery and Helles House, which stopped the attack on the right flank. Requette Farm was lost to a German counter-attack around noon and attempts by reinforcements to re-take the farm were abandoned as dark fell. The brigade extended a defensive flank on the right to maintain contact with the 18th (Eastern) Division. The new front line curved back through Besace Farm to west of Helles House, south-west of Requette Farm, north of Poelcappelle.

Beyond the railway, the advance of the 51st Brigade veered slightly south, away from a German strongpoint which caused many casualties and lost touch with the Guards Division. South of the embankment, astride the Broombeek and Watervlietbeek streams, several German farm strongpoints, pillboxes and shell-hole positions were overrun by the infantry, who were able to keep well up to the very-slow-moving barrage. The brigade reached its first objective by  despite a number of German reinforcements arriving through the British artillery barrages. By noon the advance was complete,  had been taken and no German counter-attack followed, resistance being limited to a small amount of rifle fire.

In cold, wet weather, the 3rd Guards Brigade made a short advance behind a ragged barrage, took the higher ground on the edge of Houthoulst Forest and cut off the rest of the spur running north-east from Veldhoek. Contact with the 17th (Northern) Division on the right flank was lost, after the left flank formation of the 17th (Northern) Division veered south and the crew of a contact patrol aircraft failed to see the loss of direction. Two platoons due to meet the attacking brigade of the 17th (Northern) Division had to dig in near the Angle Point pillbox under machine-gun fire. After dark, the Guards and the 17th (Northern) Division closed the gap, by capturing the blockhouses at Angle Point and Aden House. Next day, conditions were so bad that the attacking brigade was relieved by the 1st Guards Brigade. The fresh troops patrolled vigorously to the southern edge of Houthoulst Forest against little organised German resistance, except for extensive sniping around the Colbert cross-roads and Colombo House.

Air operations

During the battle, forty-one British pilots made low-altitude strafing and bomb attacks. British aircraft observers made  to destroy German artillery batteries and an additional  for artillery battery neutralisation. The British flew four bombing raids on German encampments and railway stations, eight reconnaissance flights beyond the battlefront and engaged in twelve dogfights with German aircraft. The British squadrons lost fourteen aircraft; five crew members returned wounded.

Aftermath

Analysis

The defence of the 4th Army on 12 October was more effective than expected by the British. The German 18th Division held the line opposite Poelcappelle and retained most of its area after committing all of its reserves. The German command considered the Allied advance in the north to be less dangerous than that towards the  defensive line, between Passchendaele and Drogenbroodhoek. One division was moved to Morslede and another to the area between Westrozebeke and Stadenberg, either side of Passchendaele. The 195th Division at Passchendaele had so many casualties from 9 to 12 October that it had to be relieved by the 238th Division. Ludendorff changed his mind about the prospect of retaining Passchendaele Ridge, believing that the British had only fourteen days before the weather made attacks impossible and ordered Rupprecht to stand fast.

The British attack was costly for both sides but captured more ground opposite Passchendaele than on 9 October; the British took prisoner more than  British artillery support was inadequate, due to the amount of field artillery out of action and the vast increase in mud, which smothered high-explosive shell-detonations. The weather from 4 to 12 October also prevented counter-battery fire and little was achieved by the heavier guns. On 13 October, the British decided to stop the offensive until better weather returned and roads and tracks had been repaired, to ensure that deliberate attacks with a greater quantity of artillery support could be resumed. Operations were to continue to reach a suitable line for the winter and to keep German attention on Flanders, to help the French attack due on 23 October and the Third Army operation south of Arras set for mid-November (the Battle of Cambrai). The Canadian Corps relieved the II Anzac Corps on 18 October, in the depression between Gravenstafel Ridge and the heights at Passchendaele. The captured ground made a slightly better starting line for the Second Battle of Passchendaele, which began on 26 October.

Casualties and commemoration

Ludendorff divided the Third Battle of Ypres into five periods. In the Fourth Battle of Flanders, from 2 to 21 October, he described German casualties as "extraordinarily high". Hindenburg wrote later that he waited with great anxiety for the wet season. In  (1942/1956), the German official historians recorded  including  for the accounting period  but did not give a separate figure for 12 October. The 4th Australian Division suffered  and the 3rd Australian Division  From , the German 195th Division lost  casualties. Calculations of German losses by James Edmonds, the British official historian, have been severely criticised, for adding  to German casualty figures, to account for different methods of calculation.

In 2007, Harper wrote that  Zealanders were killed,  wounded and  died of their wounds in the following week. The 4th Division lost  from 4 to 12 October. The New Zealand memorial at Tyne Cot, commemorates New Zealanders killed during the Battle of Broodseinde and the First Battle of Passchendaele, who have no known grave and the Buttes New Zealand Memorial contains the remains of New Zealand troops killed from September 1917 until February 1918. In 1997, Christopher Pugsley wrote that the casualties made 12 October 1917 New Zealand's blackest day and in 2007, Glyn Harper wrote that ".... more New Zealanders were killed or maimed in these few short hours than on any other day in the nation's history".

Victoria Cross
 Private Albert Halton of the 1st Battalion, King's Own (Royal Lancaster Regiment).
 Captain Clarence Jeffries of the 34th Australian Battalion.

Subsequent operations

On 22 October the 18th (Eastern) Division of XVIII Corps attacked the east end of Polecappelle as XIV Corps to the north attacked with the 34th Division between the Watervlietbeek and Broenbeek streams and the 35th Division attacked northwards into Houthoulst Forest. (The 35th Division was supported by a regiment of the French 1st Division on the left flank.) The attack was intended to push forward the left flank of the Fifth Army, to guard against a German counter-attack on the flank of the Canadian Corps, when it attacked Passchendaele. The artillery of the Second and Fifth armies conducted a bombardment to simulate a general attack as a deception. Poelcappelle was captured but the attack at the junction between the 34th and 35th divisions was repulsed. German counter-attacks pushed back the 35th Division in the centre but the French captured all their objectives. Attacking on ground cut up by bombardments and soaked by rain, the British had struggled to advance in places and lost the ability to move quickly to outflank pillboxes. The infantry of the 35th Division reached the fringes of Houthoulst Forest; after being outflanked it was pushed back in places. German counter-attacks after 22 October were equally disadvantaged and costly failures. The German 4th Army was prevented from transferring troops away from the Fifth Army and from concentrating its artillery-fire on the Canadians as they prepared for the Second Battle of Passchendaele (26 October – 10 November 1917).

See also

 Second Battle of Passchendaele

Notes

Footnotes

References

Books
 
 
 
 
 
 
 
 
 
 
 
 
 
 
 
 
 
 
 
 
 
 
 
 

Journals
 

Theses

Further reading

External links

 Order of Battle – France and Flanders 1917 – Order of Battle for the First Battle of Passchendaele
 Passchendaele, Canada's Other Vimy Ridge
 New Zealand Emblems and Monuments, New Zealand Ministry for Culture and Heritage
 New Zealand Army article: Passchendaele

Conflicts in 1917
1917 in Belgium
Battles of the Western Front (World War I)
Battles of World War I involving the United Kingdom
Battles of World War I involving Germany
Battles of World War I involving Australia
Battles of World War I involving New Zealand
Battles of World War I involving France
Ypres Salient
First Battle
1917 in France
October 1917 events